Khizrabad also known as Khidrabad is about 800 years old Village in South East district of Delhi. It is situated near New Friends Colony and Taimoor Nagar. The village is dominated by Bidhuri, clan of the Gurjar community who are descendants of Baba Rupa. Baba Rupa moved from Madanpur Khadar Village to Khizrabad Village. According to Villagers, Khidr-abad means "Khadar me Aabad" since the village is situated at the Banks of Yamuna.

History 

According to villagers, the village is about 800 years old, and for initial years it was inhabited by Kahar Caste. But around Samwat 1400, One Baba Rupa shifted to Khizrabad from Madanpur Khadar Village. the current generation is descendants of Baba Rupa who was of Bidhuri Clan of Gurjar community.

Notable people 

 Kunwar Bidhuri  Ranji Player, Delhi

See also
 Tughlakabad Village
 Tehkhand
 Madanpur Khadar Village
 Fatehpur Beri Village
 Old Pilanji Village

References 

Villages in South East District Delhi